Monroe Residential Historic District may refer to:

Monroe Residential Historic District (Monroe, Louisiana), listed on the National Register of Historic Places in Ouachita Parish, Louisiana
Monroe Residential Historic District (Monroe, North Carolina), listed on the National Register of Historic Places in Union County

See also
Monroe Historic District (disambiguation)